Xiaoyi is a Chinese AI-powered robotic medical doctor developed by the iFlyTek, an AI company headquartered in China. The robot is developed to function as an assistant to human doctors to improve efficiency in the future treatments as in competition to IBM's Watson, Amazon's Echo and Google's DeepMind Health. Xiaoyi is known to be the first robot in the world which makes history by passing the China's National Medical Licensing Examination, the first assessment of its kind for any would-be doctor practicing in the country.

Overview 
Chinese robot's name ‘Xiaoyi’ that means "Little Doctor" became the first AI robot to pass the Medical Licensing Exam, developed by iFlyTek in collaboration with Tsinghua University.

As per the Beijing News, it is clearly stated that before in the practice round, Xiaoyi hardly attained 100 out of 600 points in China's medical licensing exam which was quite unsatisfactory for the developers as the passing were 360 points. Xiaoyi prepared again, thus by thoroughly going through the dozens of medical textbooks’ materials, two million medical records and furthermore reviewed 400,000 articles in order to develop the kind of a reasoning ability needed to become a doctor. The robot took a fraction of allotted time required to complete the test when attempted real test, passing with a score of 456 which was 96 points higher than the passing marks afterwards.

Xiaoyi's development is a part of great efforts by China in accelerating the AI application in consumer electronics, healthcare and many other industries. An artificial intelligence-enabled robot can automatically capture and analyze the patient's information and can make initial diagnostics. Liu Qingfeng, chairman of iFlytek, said, "We will officially launch the robot in March 2018. It is not meant to replace doctors. Instead, it is to promote better people-machine cooperation so as to boost efficiency."

References

External links 
 Official website

Medical robots
Internet memes
Robots of China
Bipedal humanoid robots
2000 robots